Talış is a village and municipality in the Hajigabul District of Azerbaijan. It has a population of 1,636.

References

External links 

Populated places in Hajigabul District